Jon Conway (born May 6, 1977) is an American retired soccer goalkeeper and current goalkeeping coach for Toronto FC.

Youth and college
Born in Media, Pennsylvania, as a youth, Conway played club soccer for the Lower Merion Gorillas, leading them to the Under 13 Indoor and Outdoor state championships in 1990 - this was the first Lower Merion club to capture both state titles in the same year.  They are arguably the greatest team in LMSC history (ask Biff Sturla).  He later played for powerhouse youth soccer club F.C. Delco, and played four years of college soccer at Rutgers University. Conway was an all-state soccer player from Sun Valley High School in Aston, Pennsylvania.

Professional career
Conway was drafted with the 28th pick of the 2000 MLS SuperDraft by San Jose Earthquakes.  Conway spent his first years as a professional as the backup to Joe Cannon, but was given his chance at the starting position when Cannon left the Quakes in 2003 for France.

In 2000, he went on loan with Bay Area Seals, playing four games with a 0.50 goals against average.  Conway suffered a broken right ankle in preseason and the Quakes were forced to find a replacement; that replacement came in the form of Canadian international goalkeeper Pat Onstad from Rochester Raging Rhinos of the A-League, who went on to be named Goalkeeper of the year in MLS. Conway remained a capable backup keeper for the Quakes, playing in the occasional US Open Cup games and when Onstad was injured or away on international duty. Conway has won 2 MLS Cup Championships.

After the 2005 season, Conway was traded to the MetroStars in exchange for a fourth-round draft pick. In 2006, Conway finished best among all goalkeepers in MLS with a 1.00 GAA (goals against average) and compiled a record of 7 wins, 2 losses and 3 ties with 5 shutouts. In 2007, Conway compiled a record of 6 wins, 5 losses and 2 ties with 4 shutouts and a 1.10 GAA. He entered the 2008 season as the starting goalkeeper for the since renamed New York Red Bulls. On October 16, 2008, Conway received a 10-game suspension from MLS for violating its Substance Abuse and Behavioral Health policy (SABH), after he tested positive for performance-enhancing substances.  On June 29, 2009, Conway was released by New York to free a spot for Senegalese goal keeper Bouna Coundoul.

In September 2009, Conway's MLS rights, which under MLS roster rules were still held by Red Bulls even after his release, were traded to Chivas USA for a fourth-round pick in the 2011 MLS SuperDraft.

After the waiving of back-up keeper Brian Edwards, Toronto FC acquired the 32-year-old goalkeeper to replace Edwards. Conway made his debut for Toronto in the Canadian Championship against the Vancouver Whitecaps May 19, 2010. He continued to make non-league appearances for Toronto throughout the 2010 season within the Canadian Championship and the CONCACAF Champions League. Conway had a stand out performance versus Real Salt Lake in the Champions League in a 1–1 home draw on September 28, 2010 setting up teammate Jacob Peterson with a long throw to start the break. He made his first league appearance for Toronto on October 16, 2010 in a 2–2 home draw versus Columbus Crew in which he received a red card in the 72nd minute.

Toronto traded Conway to Chicago Fire on January 13, 2011 in exchange for the No. 49 pick in the 2011 MLS SuperDraft. At season's end, Chicago declined his 2012 contract option and he entered the 2011 MLS Re-Entry Draft. Conway was selected by Los Angeles Galaxy in stage 2 of the draft. However, he instead opted to retire.

Coaching career
After retiring, he became the goalkeeper coach with the Toronto FC Academy in 2012. In 2014, he joined the Toronto FC first team as goalkeeper coach.

Personal
He is married to sports broadcaster Andi Petrillo.

Honors

Club
San Jose Earthquakes
Major League Soccer MLS Cup Champion: 2001, 2003

New York Red Bulls
Major League Soccer Western Conference Champions: 2008

Toronto FC
Canadian Championship: 2010, 2016
Major League Soccer Eastern Conference Champions: 2016

References

External links
 

1977 births
Living people
American soccer players
Rutgers Scarlet Knights men's soccer players
San Jose Earthquakes players
Bay Area Seals players
New York Red Bulls players
Chivas USA players
Toronto FC players
Chicago Fire FC players
Association football goalkeepers
A-League (1995–2004) players
Expatriate soccer players in Canada
American expatriate sportspeople in Canada
American expatriate soccer players
Soccer players from Pennsylvania
Major League Soccer players
San Jose Earthquakes draft picks
Toronto FC non-playing staff
Doping cases in association football
People from Media, Pennsylvania
Association football goalkeeping coaches